Michael M. Coroza (Manila) is a Philippine writer and translator writing in the language of Filipino, and is a S.E.A. Write Award laureate.

Short Curriculum Vitae
In 1990 he graduated from the University of Santo Tomas. He got master's degree from the Ateneo de Manila University (2001) and Ph.D. degree - in the field of Philippine literature and translation - at the University of the Philippines (2010). Currently professor of literature at the Arts Faculty of the Ateneo de Manila University. He's also the Secretary-General of the Union of Writers of the Philippines.

Creativity
He writes poetry, fiction, critical essays and is engaged in literary translation. The writer's works have been published in national and international literary magazines: Kritika Kultura, Philippine Studies, Unitas, Tomas, Bulawan Journal of Arts and Culture, Daluyan, Loyola Schools Review, and the Malay Indonesian Studies. He is famous for promoting the traditional poetic genre of the Philippines "balagtasan". He Has a column in a literary magazine Haraya (Imagination) and Liwayway (Dawn). He participated in international poetry readings "Kuala Lumpur-10" (2004) and the Second literary festival "Korea-ASEAN" in Jakarta (2011).

Major works
ASEANO: An Anthology of Poems from Southeast Asia (1995).
Dili’t Dilim (1997)
Mga Lagot na Liwanag (2001)
Antologi Puisi dan Kemanusiaan (2004)
The SEA Write Anthology of ASEAN Short Stories & Poems (2008)
Imbisibol Man ang Tatay (2009)
Ang mga Kahon ni Kalon (2010)
Sounds of Asia (2011)
Ang mga Lambing ni Lolo Ding (2012)
Nawawala si Muningning (2015)
Sa Pagtula, Ako. - Taufiq Ismail. Dengan Puisi, Aku. 1 Puisi, 80 Bahasa, 80 Tahun. Terjemahan Puisi dalam 58 Bahasa Dunia dan 22 Bahasa Daerah. Prakata Prof. Victor A. Pogadaev. Jakarta: Horison, 2015.

Awards
Don Carlos Literary Award (1991-2009 gg. - Eight times) 
Francisco Balagtas Prize by the Committee of Philippine literature (2005) 
S.E.A. Write Award (2007) 
Award of Honor Ani ng Dangal by the National Committee for Culture and Arts (2009) 
Rev. Horacio de la Costa Prize by Ateneo de Manila University (2012)

Family
Wife - Jeanette Job Coroza - Director of High School. Three children Miko Idyanale (1995), Jean Araya (1996), Miguel Bulavan (2003). Parents reside in Marikina.

References

1969 births
Living people
20th-century Filipino poets
People from Manila
Writers from Metro Manila
University of Santo Tomas alumni
University of the Philippines alumni
Ateneo de Manila University alumni
Academic staff of Ateneo de Manila University
21st-century Filipino poets
Filipino male poets
Filipino translators
20th-century male writers
21st-century male writers